Buñuel in the Labyrinth of the Turtles is a 2018 Spanish biographical animated film directed by Salvador Simó and with a screenplay written by Eligio R. Montero and Simó himself based on the graphic novel Buñuel en el laberinto de las tortugas by Fermín Solís, about film director Luis Buñuel making the 1933 film Land Without Bread. In August 2019, it was shortlisted as one of the three films in contention to be the Spanish entry for the Academy Award for Best International Feature Film at the 92nd Academy Awards, but lost to Pain and Glory.

Plot
The controversy surrounding his first feature length film, L'Age d'Or, leaves director Luis Buñuel unable to find new work.  An anthropologist named Maurice Legendre hands Buñuel an ethnographic study of the Las Hurdes region of Spain and asks if he would consider making a documentary of the region.  Buñuel's friend, sculptor Ramón Acín, buys a lottery ticket and promises to use the winnings to fund the film.  Indeed, Ramón wins and keeps his promise.  So Buñuel assembles a film crew in the town of La Alberca.

From La Alberca, Buñuel drives the crew to a monastery that doubles as a hostel.  From the monastery, the crew explores the nearby villages.  The villages consist of ramshackle box-shaped houses packed tightly.  The winding streets between the houses make each village resemble a labyrinth, and Ramón notes that the jagged roofs resemble the scales on a turtle.  The crew find themselves appalled by the poverty-stricken conditions of the homes.  The plentifulness of their food supplies astonishes villagers.  When they film a school, they find out that locals make most of their money getting government payments for taking in orphaned children, and the schoolchildren crowd around Buñuel desperate for affection.  Buñuel later finds a little girl dying on the street, and feels helpless not having the medicine that would cure her.

Although the film is a documentary, Buñuel stages many scenes for dramatic effect, in opposition to his crew.  In La Alberca, Buñuel makes Ramón hire a farmer to reenact the local tradition of ripping the head off of a rooster.  Later on, Buñuel wants to film the image of a mountain goat slipping and falling down a cliffside, but shoots a goat dead rather than wait for an accident to happen.  Buñuel also arranges for a donkey to get stung to death by bees, to use as a symbol for the suffering of the local people.

All through the shoot, Buñuel is tormented by nightmares of his troubled childhood.  One nightmare about his mother and the Virgin Mary compels him to dress in a nun's habit.  When the sick girl finally dies, Buñuel has a nightmare where he sees a friend from the region as Death.  The nightmare inspires him to have the villagers reenact a funeral for an infant for the film.

By 1933, Buñuel is back in Paris editing his film, Las Hurdes: Tierra Sin Pan.  Notes at the end of this movie explain that days after the Nationalist coup in Spain, Ramón Acín and then his wife were executed for their Anarchist activity.  Buñuel is able to release his movie in Spain, but without Ramón's name. Movie notes explain that he was able to restore Ramon's name to the credits many years later.

Release
The world premiere was held at the 2018 Animation Is Film Festival in Los Angeles on October 20, 2018. It was released in cinemas in Spain on April 26, 2019.

Awards and nominations

Accolades

References

External links
 

2018 animated films
2010s biographical films
Spanish animated films
Spanish biographical films
Films about film directors and producers
Films about filmmaking
Films set in Paris
Films set in Spain
Films set in the 1930s
Animated feature films
Films based on Spanish comics
Animated films based on comics
Extremadura in fiction
2010s Spanish films